Aleksandr Zhirov may refer to:

 Aleksandr Zhirov (alpine skier) (1958–1983), Soviet alpine skier
 Aleksandr Zhirov (footballer) (born 1991), Russian footballer